2013 Czech Lion Awards ceremony was held on 22 February 2014.

Winners and nominees

Non-statutory Awards
 Best Film Poster
Burning Bush
 Film Fans Award
Fair Play
 Magnesie Award for Best Student Film
The Little Cousteau

References

2013 film awards
2013